Vrt'o is a surname. Notable people with the surname include:

Dušan Vrťo (born 1965), Slovak footballer
Tomáš Vrťo (born 1988), Czech footballer